The Team free routine competition at the 2019 World Aquatics Championships was held on 17 and 19 July 2019.

Results
The preliminary round was started on 17 July at 11:00. The final was started on 19 July at 19:00.

Green denotes finalists

References

Team free routine